"Front 2 Back" is the second single from Xzibit's third album Restless, produced by Rockwilder.

Music Video 
A music video for the song directed by Diane Martel was released. The music video features cameo appearances by Kurupt, Karrine Steffans, Tha Alkaholiks, Ras Kass, Alex Thomas, Mr. Marcus, and Rockwilder.

Track listing
 Front 2 Back (Explicit)
 Alkaholik (Explicit)
 X (Howie Beno Mix-Main)
 Front 2 Back (Instrumental)

Charts

Release history

References

2000 singles
2000 songs
Song recordings produced by Rockwilder
Xzibit songs
Gangsta rap songs
G-funk songs
Songs written by Xzibit
Loud Records singles